The Echo of a Song is a 1997 studio album by Ian Shaw.

Track listing
"I Concentrate on You" (Cole Porter) - 3:37
"My Heart Is Haunted" (Egan, Flynn) - 4:42
"It Could Happen to You" (Johnny Burke, Jimmy Van Heusen) - 3:57
"It's Easy to Remember (And So Hard to Forget)" (Lorenz Hart, Richard Rodgers) - 5:41
"Just Let Me Look at You" (Dorothy Fields, Jerome Kern) - 4:44
"The Echo of a Song" (Peter Mendoza) - 5:35
"Change Partners" (Irving Berlin) - 4:59
"You Are My Heart's Delight" (Steve Graham, Ludwig Herver, Franz Lehár) - 4:21
"Time After Time" (Sammy Cahn, Jule Styne) - 5:35
"You Stepped Out of a Dream" (Nacio Herb Brown, Gus Kahn) - 3:55
"Taking a Chance on Love" (Vernon Duke, Ted Fetter, John Latouche) - 3:22
"I'll Be Seeing You" (Sammy Fain, Irving Kahal) - 3:26
"Goodnight, Angel" (Herbert Magidson, Allie Wrubel) - 4:14

Personnel
Performance
Ian Shaw - vocals, producer, liner notes
Simon Wallace - piano, producer
Mark Fletcher - drums
Geoff Gascoyne - double bass, design, drawing
Mornington Lockett - clarinet, soprano saxophone, tenor saxophone
Production
Chris Lewis - producer, engineer, mastering, mixing
David Sinclair - photography
Richard Rodney Bennett - liner notes

References

Ian Shaw (singer) albums
1997 albums